This article lists career accomplishments of the American professional basketball player LeBron James.

NBA career statistics
Correct as of the 2021–22 season.

Regular season

|-
| style="text-align:left;"| 
| style="text-align:left;"| Cleveland
| 79 || 79 || 39.5 || .500|| .290 || .754 || 5.5 || 5.9 || 1.6 || .7 || 20.9
|-
| style="text-align:left;"| 
| style="text-align:left;"| Cleveland
| 80 || 80 || style="background:#cfecec;"| 42.4* || .472 || .351 || .750 || 7.4 || 7.2 || 2.2 || .7 || 27.2
|-
| style="text-align:left;"| 
| style="text-align:left;"| Cleveland
| 79 || 79 || 42.5 || .480 || .335 || .738 || 7.0 || 6.6 || 1.6 || .8 || 31.4
|-
| style="text-align:left;"| 
| style="text-align:left;"| Cleveland
| 78 || 78 || 40.9 || .476 || .319 || .698 || 6.7 || 6.0 || 1.6 || .7|| 27.3
|-
| style="text-align:left;"| 
| style="text-align:left;"| Cleveland
| 75 || 74 || 40.4 || .484 || .315 || .712 || 7.9 || 7.2 || 1.8 || 1.1 || style="background:#cfecec;" | 30.0*
|-
| style="text-align:left;"| 
| style="text-align:left;"| Cleveland
| 81 || 81 || 37.7 || .489 || .344 || .780 || 7.6 || 7.2 || 1.7 || 1.1 || 28.4
|-
| style="text-align:left;"| 
| style="text-align:left;"| Cleveland
| 76 || 76 || 39.0 || .503 || .333 || .767 || 7.3 || 8.6 || 1.6 || 1.0 || 29.7
|-
| style="text-align:left;"| 
| style="text-align:left;"| Miami
| 79 || 79 || 38.8 || .510 || .330 || .759 || 7.5 || 7.0 || 1.6 || .6 || 26.7
|-
|style="text-align:left;background:#afe6ba;"|†
|style="text-align:left;"|Miami
|62||62||37.5||.531||.362||.771||7.9||6.2||1.9||.8||27.1
|-
|style="text-align:left;background:#afe6ba;"|†
|style="text-align:left;"|Miami
|76||76||37.9||.565||.406||.753||8.0||7.3||1.7||.9||26.8
|-
|style="text-align:left;"|
|style="text-align:left;"|Miami
|77||77||37.7||.567||.379||.750||6.9||6.4||1.6||.3||27.1
|-
|style="text-align:left;"|
|style="text-align:left;"|Cleveland
|69||69||36.1||.488||.354||.710||6.0||7.4||1.6||.7||25.3
|-
|style="text-align:left;background:#afe6ba;"|†
|style="text-align:left;"|Cleveland
|76||76||35.6||.520||.309||.731||7.4||6.8||1.4||.6||25.3
|-
|style="text-align:left;"|
|style="text-align:left;"|Cleveland
|74||74|| style="background:#cfecec;"| 37.8*||.548||.363||.674||8.6||8.7||1.2||.6||26.4
|-
|style="text-align:left;"|
|style="text-align:left;"|Cleveland
|style="background:#cfecec;"| 82*|| style="background:#cfecec;"| 82*|| style="background:#cfecec;"| 36.9*||.542||.367||.731||8.6||9.1||1.4||.9||27.5
|-
|style="text-align:left;"|
|style="text-align:left;"|L.A. Lakers
|55||55|| 35.2||.510||.339||.665||8.5||8.3||1.3||.6||27.4
|-
|style="text-align:left;background:#afe6ba;"|†
|style="text-align:left;"|L.A. Lakers
|67||67|| 34.6||.493||.348||.693||7.8||style="background:#cfecec;"| 10.2*||1.2||.5||25.3
|-
|style="text-align:left;"|
|style="text-align:left;"|L.A. Lakers
|45||45|| 33.4||.513||.365||.698||7.7|| 7.8 ||1.1||.6||25.0
|-
|style="text-align:left;"|
|style="text-align:left;"|L.A. Lakers
|56||56|| 37.2||.524||.359||.756||8.2|| 6.2 ||1.3||1.1||30.3
|- class="sortbottom"
|style="text-align:center;" colspan="2"|Career
|1,366||1,365||38.2||.505||.346||.734||7.5||7.4||1.6||.8||27.1
|- class="sortbottom"
|style="text-align:center;" colspan="2"|All-Star
|bgcolor="EOCEF2"| 18 ||bgcolor="EOCEF2"| 18 ||28.2||.515||.308||.725||6.0||5.8||1.2||.4||22.9
|}

Playoffs

|-
|style="text-align:left;"|2006
|style="text-align:left;"|Cleveland
|13||13||46.5||.476||.333||.737||8.1||5.8||1.4||.7||30.8
|-
|style="text-align:left;"|2007
|style="text-align:left;"|Cleveland
|20||20||44.7||.416||.280||.755||8.1||8.0||1.7||.5||25.1
|-
|style="text-align:left;"|2008
|style="text-align:left;"|Cleveland
|13||13||42.5||.411||.257||.731||7.8||7.6||1.8||1.3||28.2
|-
|style="text-align:left;"|2009
|style="text-align:left;"|Cleveland
|14||14||41.4||.510||.333||.749||9.1||7.3||1.6||.9||35.3
|-
|style="text-align:left;"|2010
|style="text-align:left;"|Cleveland
|11||11||41.8||.502||.400||.733||9.3||7.6||1.7||1.8||29.1
|-
|style="text-align:left;"|2011
|style="text-align:left;"|Miami
|21||21||43.9||.466||.353||.763||8.4||5.9||1.7||1.2||23.7
|-
|style="text-align:left;background:#afe6ba;"|2012†
|style="text-align:left;"|Miami
|23||23||42.7||.500||.259||.739||9.7||5.6||1.9||.7||30.3
|-
|style="text-align:left;background:#afe6ba;"|2013†
|style="text-align:left;"|Miami
|23||23||41.7||.491||.375||.777||8.4||6.6||1.8||.8||25.9
|-
|style="text-align:left;"|2014
|style="text-align:left;"|Miami
|20||20||38.2||.565||.407||.806||7.1||4.8||1.9||.6||27.4
|-
|style="text-align:left;"|2015
|style="text-align:left;"|Cleveland
|20||20||42.2||.417||.227||.731||11.3||8.5||1.7||1.1||30.1
|-
|style="text-align:left;background:#afe6ba;"|2016†
|style="text-align:left;"|Cleveland
|21||21||39.1||.525||.340||.661||9.5||7.6||2.3||1.3||26.3
|-
|style="text-align:left;"|2017
|style="text-align:left;"|Cleveland
|18||18||41.3||.565||.411||.698||9.1||7.8||1.9||1.3||32.8
|-
|style="text-align:left;"|2018
|style="text-align:left;"|Cleveland
|22||22||41.9||.539||.342||.746||9.1||9.0||1.4||1.0||34.0
|-
|style="text-align:left;background:#afe6ba;"|2020†
|style="text-align:left;"|L.A. Lakers
|21||21||36.3||.560||.370||.720||10.8||8.8||1.2||.9||27.6
|-
|style="text-align:left"|2021
|style="text-align:left;"|L.A. Lakers
|6||6||37.3||.474||.375||.609||7.2||8.0||1.5||.3||23.3
|- class="sortbottom"
|style="text-align:center;" colspan="2"|Career
|bgcolor="EOCEF2"| 266 ||bgcolor="EOCEF2"| 266 ||41.5||.495||.337||.740||9.0||7.2||1.7||.9||28.7
|}

Career – regular season

Top 10
most points (38,411)
most consecutive games scoring (1,372) (James has scored in every game he has played)
most consecutive games scoring at least 10 points (1,067)
most turnovers (4,788)
most 20-point games (1,136)
2nd most field goals made (13,543)
2nd most 30-point games (517)
3rd most minutes played (52,139)
4th most assists (10,354)
4th most 10-point games (1,364)
4th most field goals attempted (26,825)
4th most 3-point field goals attempted (6,494)
4th most free throws made (7,836)
4th most field goals missed (13,282)
5th most free throws attempted (10,673)
5th most triple doubles (105)
6th most 50-point games (14)  (tied with Rick Barry)
6th most 2-point field goals missed (11,403)
6th most points per game (27.0)
7th most games started scoring at least 1 point (1,371)
7th most 60-point games (1) (tied with 19 others)
9th most steals (2179)
9th most 3-point field goals made (2237)
10th most 40-point games (69)
10th most games scoring at least 1 point (1,372)

Career – playoffs

Top 10
most points (7,631)
most field goals made (2,671)
most field goals attempted (5,502)
most field goals missed (2,777)
most free throws made (1,749)
most free throws attempted (2,364)
most 3-point field goals attempted (1,283)
most steals (454)
most turnovers (975)
most minutes played (11,035)
most games played (266)
most consecutive games scoring (266) (James has scored in every game he has played)
2nd most assists (1,919)
2nd most defensive rebounds (1,990)
2nd most 3-point field goals made (432)
2nd most triple doubles (28)
3rd most Finals appearances (10)
6th most points per game (28.7)
6th most rebounds (2,391)
10th most blocks (252)

Career – regular season and playoffs combined
most points (44,724)
most consecutive games scoring (1,635) (James has scored in every game he has played)
most turnovers (5,788)
2nd most minutes played (63,392)
2nd most field goals made (16,327)
2nd most field goals attempted (32,459)
3rd most free throws made (9,610)
3rd most free throws attempted (13,069)
4th most 3-point field goals attempted (7,515)
5th most assists (12,008)
5th most games played (1,636)
6th most 3-point field goals made (2,584)
8th most steals (2,599)

Awards and accomplishments

NBA
Cited from Basketball Reference's LeBron James page unless noted otherwise.
 18× All-NBA selection:
 2× Third team: , 
 6× NBA All-Defensive selection:
 Second Team: 
 NBA Rookie of the Year: 
 NBA All-Rookie First Team: 
 NBA scoring leader: 
 NBA assists leader: 
 J. Walter Kennedy Citizenship Award:

United States National Team
Cited from USA Basketball's LeBron James page unless noted otherwise.

3× Olympic medalist:
2× Gold: 2008, 2012
Bronze: 2004
FIBA World Cup medalist:
Bronze: 2006
FIBA AmeriCup medalist:
Gold: 2007
USA Basketball Male Athlete of the Year: 2012

High school
Cited from the NBA's LeBron James prospect profile page unless noted otherwise.

National Basketball champion: 2003
3× State champion: 2000, 2001, 2003
2× Gatorade National Player of the Year: 2002, 2003
2× Mr. Basketball USA: 2002, 2003
2× USA Today High School Player of the Year: 2002, 2003
3× Ohio Mr. Basketball: 2001, 2002, 2003
3× USA Today All-USA First Team: 2001, 2002, 2003
2× PARADE High School Player of the Year: 2002, 2003
2× First-team Parade All-American: 2002, 2003
Second-team Parade All-American: 2001
Gatorade Male Athlete of the Year: 2003
Naismith Prep Player of the Year: 2003
McDonald's National Player of the Year: 2003
McDonald's High School All-American: 2003
McDonald's Slam Dunk Contest (Powerade Jam Fest): 2003
McDonald's All-American Game MVP: 2003
EA Sports Roundball Classic MVP: 2003
Jordan Capital Classic MVP: 2003
Morgan Wootten National Player of the Year: 2003

Other
Sports Illustrated Sportsperson of the Year: 2012, 2016
Sporting News Athlete of the Year: 2012
Sporting News NBA MVP: 2006
Sporting News Rookie of the Year: 2004
Sports Illustrated NBA All-Decade First Team: 2000–2009
7× Best NBA Player ESPY Award: 2007, 2009, 2012, 2013, 2016, 2017, 2018
3× Best Male Athlete ESPY Award: 2012, 2013, 2016
Best Breakthrough Athlete ESPY Award: 2004
4× Best Championship Performance ESPY Award: 2012, 2013, 2015, 2016
6× BET Sportsman of the Year: 2004, 2006, 2007, 2009, 2010, 2013
3× Associated Press Athlete of the Year: 2013, 2016, 2018
2× Hickok Belt: 2012, 2013
Jackie Robinson Sports Award: 2017

NBA achievements
Achievements are current as of the end of the 2022 NBA season.

Regular season

Career
 1st in career Value Over Replacement Player (VORP) (129.79).
  more than next player on the list.
 2nd in career Box Plus/Minus (8.93).
 Behind Michael Jordan (9.22).
 Most consecutive double-digit scoring games: 1096 games
 Most combined points scored on birthday (303)
 Most times being named Conference Player of the Week (64 times).
 Most times being named Conference Player of the Month (46 times).
 Most All-NBA First Team selections (13).
 3rd most 10-point games in NBA history (1,402)
 Behind Kareem Abdul-Jabbar (1,509) and Karl Malone (1,441)
Most 20-point games in NBA history (1,173).
 2nd most 30-point games in NBA history (531)
 Behind Michael Jordan (562).
 2nd career in Player Efficiency Rating or PER (27.59)
 Behind Michael Jordan (27.91)
 Most seasons scoring at least 1,000 points (20)
 3rd most seasons scoring at least 2,000 points (10)
 Behind Karl Malone (12) and Michael Jordan (11).
 4th most NBA Most Valuable Player Awards (4).
Behind Kareem Abdul-Jabbar (6), Michael Jordan (5) and Bill Russell (5).
 Tied with Wilt Chamberlain (4).
 Only player in NBA history to record at least 30,000 points, 10,000 rebounds, and 10,000 assists.
 No other player has at least 9,000 rebounds and 9,000 assists, regardless of points.
 Only player in NBA history to post at least 2,000 points, 500 rebounds, 500 assists, and 100 steals in four consecutive seasons.
 Only player in NBA history to post at least 2,000 points, 500 rebounds, 500 assists, and 100 steals in a single season for at least eight seasons.
 Only player in NBA history to post at least 2,000 points, 500 rebounds, and 500 assists in a single season for at least eight seasons.
 Only player in NBA history to average at least 25 points per game for 18 consecutive seasons.
 Only player in NBA history to be in the top 5 all-time in points, top 10 all-time in assists, and top 10 all-time in steals.
 No other player is in the top 10 in both categories 
 Only player in NBA history to have at least 10,000 rebounds and 10,000 assists.
 One of two players in NBA history to win four NBA Most Valuable Player Awards in a span of five years.
 The other is Bill Russell.
 One of two players in NBA history to win at least two NBA Most Valuable Player Awards for two different franchises.
 The other is Kareem Abdul-Jabbar.
 One of two players in NBA history to win NBA MVP, Finals MVP, and an Olympic gold medal in the same year.
 The other is Michael Jordan (1992).
 One of two players in NBA history to win at least four NBA MVP awards and four NBA Finals MVP awards.
 The other is Michael Jordan.
 One of two players in NBA history to record a triple double against all NBA teams.
 The other is Russell Westbrook.
 One of six players in NBA history to win consecutive Finals MVP Awards.
Includes Michael Jordan, Shaquille O'Neal, Hakeem Olajuwon, Kobe Bryant and Kevin Durant
Only player in NBA history to score 10 points or more in 1,000 consecutive games
Only player in NBA history to score 100 30-point games with 3 different teams
Only player in NBA history to have a 40-point game against all 30 NBA teams

Season
 Only player in NBA history to post 30 or more points and shoot over 60 percent for six consecutive games in a single season.
 One of two players in NBA history to average  at least 30 points, 8 rebounds, and 6 assists on 50% shooting  in a single season.
 The other is Michael Jordan.
 One of five players in NBA history to average at least 20 points, 5 rebounds, and 5 assists in their rookie season.
Includes Oscar Robertson, Michael Jordan, Tyreke Evans and Luka Dončić.
One of five players in NBA history to average a triple-double in a calendar month
With Oscar Robertson, Wilt Chamberlain, Russell Westbrook and Luka Dončić. James is the oldest in age to do so.

Game 

 Only player in NBA history to record at least 35 points, 15 assists, and 0 turnovers in a game.

All-Star

Career All-Star
Top 10

Most points scored (426)
Most three-point attempts (130)
Most field goals made (172)
Most 2-point field goals made (132)
Most field goal attempts (334)
Most minutes played (509)
Most starts (19)
Most consecutive starts (19)
Most games played (19)
Most turnovers (58)
Most games selected (19) - tied with Kareem Abdul-Jabbar
2nd Most MVP awards (3) - tied with 3 others
2nd Most defensive rebounds (95)
2nd Most three-point field goals (40)
3rd Most 2-point field goals attempts (204)
3rd Most assists (110)
6th Most points per game (22.4)
6th Most total rebounds (110)
8th Most steals (22)
10th Most blocks (8) - tied with 3 others

Game All-Star
Top 10

2nd Most three-point field goals (6) - tied with 9 others
4th Most free throws (9) - tied with 10 others
5th Most field goals made (15) - tied with 2 others
5th Most steals (4) - tied with 28 others
5th Most blocks (2) - tied with 19 others
6th Most defensive rebounds (10) (achieved twice) - tied with 3 others
7th Most field goal attempts (24) - tied with 4 others
7th Most  three-point field goal attempts (12) - tied with 6 others
8th Most points (36) - tied with 3 others
10th Most assists (10) - tied with 10 others

Playoffs
 Most all-time playoff Points (7,631)
 Most all-time playoff Wins (174)
 Most all-time playoff Games (266)
 Most all-time playoff Minutes (11,035)
 Most all-time playoff Field Goals Made (2,725)
 Most all-time playoff Field Goal Attempts (5,502)
 Most all-time playoff Field Goals Missed (2,777)
 Most all-time playoff 3-Point Field Goal Attempts (1,283)
 Most all-time playoff Free Throws Made (1,749)
 Most all-time playoff Free Throw Attempts (2,364)
 Most all-time playoff Steals (445)
 Most all-time playoff Turnovers (975)
 First and currently only player in NBA history to win Finals MVP with three different franchises (2 with MIA, 1 with CLE, and 1 with LAL)
 One of only two players in NBA history to win at least one Finals MVP with an Eastern Conference team and a Western Conference team
 The other is Kawhi Leonard

Career
 Most playoff games with at least 20 points (232).
 Most playoff games with at least 25 points (181)
 Most playoff games with at least 30 points (118)
 Most playoff games with at least 20 points, 5 rebounds, and 5 assists (183)
 Most playoff games with at least 20 points, 10 rebounds, and 5 assists (87)
 Most playoff games with at least 20 points, 10 rebounds, and 10 assists (26)
 All other active players have 33 combined 
 Most playoff games with at least 30 points, 5 rebounds, and 5 assists (92)
 Most playoff games with at least 30 points, 10 rebounds, and 5 assists (48).
 Most playoff games with at least 30 points, 10 rebounds, and 10 assists (15)
 Most playoff games with at least 40 points, 5 rebounds, and 5 assists (25).
 All other active players have 30 combined
 Most playoff games with at least 40 points, 10 rebounds, and 5 assists (14)
 Most playoff games with at least 40 points, 10 rebounds, and 10 assists (3)
 No other player has more than one (Jerry West, Charles Barkley, Russell Westbrook, Luka Dončić, and Jimmy Butler)
 Most playoff games with at least 45 points, 5 rebounds, and 5 assists (10)
 Tied with Michael Jordan
 Most playoff games with at least 45 points, 10 rebounds, and 5 assists (4)
 Tied with Russell Westbrook
 1st in Win Shares (51.0)
 11.24 more than the next player on the list Michael Jordan (39.76).
 2nd in Box Plus/Minus (10.16)
 0.98 behind Michael Jordan (11.14)
 1st in VORP - Value Over Replacement Player (33.1).
 10.25 more than next player on the list Michael Jordan (22.85)
 1st all-time for postseasons with at least 500 total points (9 times)
 2nd for consecutive 20-point games to start a playoff career (19).
 Behind Kareem Abdul-Jabbar (27)
 2nd place all-time for playoff games scoring at least 35 points (61)
 Behind Michael Jordan (75)
 2nd place all-time for playoff games scoring at least 40 points (27)
 Behind Michael Jordan (38)
 2nd place all-time for playoff games scoring at least 45 points (11)
 Behind Michael Jordan (23)
 2nd place all-time for triple-doubles in the playoffs (28).
 Behind Magic Johnson (30)
 2nd place all-time for most defensive rebounds in a playoffs career (1,990).
 Behind Tim Duncan (2,081)
 2nd place all-time for most NBA Finals MVP Awards (4).
Behind Michael Jordan (6)
 Only player in NBA history to be in the top 10 all-time in career playoff points, rebounds, assists, blocks and steals
 Only player in NBA history to be in the top 5 all-time in career playoff points, assists, and steals

Single postseason 
 Only player in NBA history to score at least 25 points in 15 consecutive playoff games in a single postseason.
 Only player in NBA history to record at least 500 points, 200 rebounds, and 150 assists in a single postseason, multiple times (accomplished this five times-2012, 2015, 2016, 2018, and 2020)
 Only player in NBA history to record at least 600 points, 200 rebounds, and 150 assists in a single postseason (accomplished this twice-2012 and 2018)
 Only player in NBA history to record at least 700 points, 200 rebounds, and 150 assists in a single-postseason (2018)
 One of two players in NBA history to record at least 500 points, 150 rebounds, and 150 assists in a single postseason (accomplished this seven times-2012, 2013, 2015, 2016, 2017, 2018, and 2020)
 The other is Larry Bird 
 One of two players in NBA history to record at least 600 points, 200 rebounds, and 100 assists in a single postseason twice (2012 and 2018)
 The other is Larry Bird
 One of two players in NBA history to score at least 250 points, 100 rebounds and 80 assists in the first 10 games of the playoffs (2020)
 The other is Oscar Robertson.
 One of two players in NBA history to average at least 30 points, 11 rebounds, and 8 assists per game in a single postseason (2015)
 The other is Oscar Robertson.

Series

 Only player in NBA history to lead both teams in points, rebounds, assists, blocks, and steals in a playoff series (2016 NBA Finals vs. Golden State Warriors).
 Only player in NBA history to lead both teams in points, rebounds, assists in a playoff series (twice, 2015 and 2016 NBA Finals vs. Golden State Warriors)
 One of two players in NBA history to average at least 30 points, 10 rebounds, and 10 assists in a playoff series (2017 NBA Finals vs. Golden State Warriors).
Includes Russell Westbrook.
 Only player in NBA history to win over 20 consecutive games in the first round
 Only player in NBA history to sweep 10 series in the playoffs

Game

 Most consecutive points scored for a team in a playoff game with 25 consecutive points at the Detroit Pistons on May 31, 2007.
 One of three players in NBA history to record at least 45 points, 15 rebounds, and 5 assists in a playoff game.
Includes Wilt Chamberlain and Russell Westbrook
 One of two players in NBA history to have at least 51 point, 8 assists, and 8 rebounds in a playoff game
 The other is Russell Westbrook
 One of four players in NBA history to record a triple-double in their playoff debut.
Includes Johnny McCarthy, Magic Johnson and Nikola Jokić

NBA Finals 

 Most all-time Finals Turnovers (217)
 Most all-time Finals Defensive Rebounds (454)

James ranks in the top 10 in every other major career statistical category, except personal fouls.

Top 10 :
 2nd Most all-time Finals Points (1,562)
 2nd Most all-time Finals Field Goals Made (588)
 2nd Most all-time Finals Field Goals Missed (628)
 2nd Most all-time Finals Field Goal Attempts (1,216)
 2nd Most all-time Finals 3-Point Field Goal Made (101)
 2nd Most all-time Finals 3-Point Field Goal Attempts (287)
 2nd Most all-time Finals Assists (430)
 2nd Most all-time Finals Steals (93)
 3rd Most all-time Finals Minutes (2,335)
 3rd Most all-time Finals 2-point Field Goals Made (487)
 3rd Most all-time Finals Free Throws Made (285)
 3rd Most all-time Finals Free Throw Attempts (390)
 3rd Most all-time Finals Offensive Rebounds (107)
 4th Most all-time Finals Total Rebounds (107)
 4th Most all-time Finals Games Played (55)
 6th Most all-time Finals Blocks (46)
 6th Most all-time Finals 2-point Field Goals Attempted (929)

Career 
 Most triple-doubles with at least 30 points in the NBA Finals (4).
 Most  NBA Finals games with at least 30 points, 10 rebounds, and 5 assists (9).
 2nd most NBA Finals games with at least 40 points (7).
  Only player in NBA history to play in eight consecutive NBA Finals on different teams and tied for 4th most consecutive finals appearances with Frank Ramsey
 Bill Russell (10), Tom Heinsohn (9), Sam Jones (9), and Frank Ramsey (8) played in eight or more consecutive finals on the same team
Only player in NBA history to average a triple double in the NBA Finals.

Series 
 Most points per game scored by a player on the winning team in any seven-game NBA Finals series with 29.7.
 2nd place all-time for highest percentage of team points in an NBA Finals series.
 Behind Michael Jordan's 38.4%; James accounted for 38.3% of his team's points in the 2015 NBA Finals.
 Only player in NBA history to record at least two triple-doubles with 30 or more points in one NBA Finals series.
 Only player in NBA history to average at least 25 points, 10 rebounds, and 7 assists in an NBA Finals series (accomplished this six times-2012, 2013, 2015, 2016, 2017, and 2020).
 Only player in NBA history to lead both teams in points, rebounds, and assists in an NBA Finals series. (2015 and 2016; also led both teams in steals and blocks in the 2016 Finals.)
 Only player in NBA history to average a triple-double in an NBA Finals series.
 James averaged 33.6 points, 12.0 rebounds, and 10.0 assists in the 2017 NBA Finals.
 Only player in NBA history to average at least 35 points, 10 rebounds, and 5 assists in an NBA Finals series.
 James averaged 35.8 points, 13.3 rebounds, 8.8 assists in the 2015 NBA Finals.
 Only player in NBA history to score at least 40 points in consecutive elimination games in a single NBA Finals series.
 One of three players in NBA history to score at least 40 points in at least three games in a single NBA Finals series.
 Includes Michael Jordan (who scored at least 40 points in four games in a row in the 1993 NBA Finals) and Shaquille O'Neal.

Game 
 Only player in NBA history to score at least 40 points and record at least half of his team's assists in an NBA Finals game.
 James achieved this twice in a single NBA Finals series.
One of two players in NBA history to record at least 35 points, 15 rebounds, and 10 assists in an NBA Finals game.
Includes James Worthy.
One of three players in NBA history to record a triple-double with at least 40 points in an NBA Finals game.
Includes Jerry West and Jimmy Butler.
One of two players in NBA history to record a triple-double in an NBA Finals clinching game, twice.
Includes Magic Johnson (1982 and 1985).
One of three players in NBA history to record a triple-double in an elimination game in an NBA Finals game.
Includes Bill Russell and James Worthy.
One of three players in NBA history to record a triple-double in Game 7 of the NBA Finals.
Includes Jerry West and James Worthy.
One of four players in NBA history to score at least 40 points in consecutive NBA Finals games.
Includes Jerry West (achieved this twice), Michael Jordan (achieved this in four consecutive games), Rick Barry,  Shaquille O'Neal.
One of six players in NBA history to record a triple-double in Game 1 of the NBA Finals.
Includes Wilt Chamberlain (1967), Walt Frazier (1972), Dave Cowens (1976), Magic Johnson (1991), and Jason Kidd (2002).

Youngest player records
James owns numerous NBA "youngest player" records. He is the youngest1
 To be selected #1 overall draft pick (18 years of age).
 To be named NBA Rookie of the Year (19 years of age).
 To score most points by prep-to-pro player in their professional debut (25)
 To record a triple-double in the playoffs. (21 years, 113 days).
Recorded 32 points, 11 rebounds, and 11 assists on April 22, 2006, vs. Washington Wizards.
 To score 30 points in a game (18 years, 334 days).
Recorded 33 points on November 29, 2003, vs. Memphis Grizzlies
 To score 40 points in a game (19 years, 88 days).
Recorded 41 points on March 27, 2004, vs. New Jersey Nets.
 To score 35+ points, 10+ rebounds and 7+ 3-pointers: 20 years, 100 days; 40 points, 10 rebounds, 7 3-pointers also had 10 assists. (he was also the oldest)
 To score 2,000 points in a season (2004–05).
 To average at least 30 points per game in the NBA.
 To be awarded All-NBA honors (2004–05).
 To be named to the All-NBA first team (21 years, 138 days).
 To win an All-Star Game MVP (21 years, 55 days).
 To lead the league in All-Star voting (22 years, 26 days).
 To score 2,000 points in seven consecutive seasons (26 years of age).
 To win Most Valuable Player award four times (28 years of age).
 To reach 4,000 playoff points (29 years of age).
 To reach 5,000 playoff points (30 years of age).
 To reach 6,000 playoff points (32 years of age).
 To reach 7,000 playoff points (35 years of age).
 Every thousand point milestone from 1,000 to 38,000.
Notes: 1 Beginning in 2006 the NBA introduced age requirement restrictions. Prospective high school players must now wait at least a year before entering the NBA.

Oldest player records 
 To average a triple-double in a calendar month (February 2018; 33 years 69 days on February 28, 2018)
 To have multiple 50 point games in a season (March 2022): 37 years 65 days & 37 years 71 days (this is also the record for a single month and single week).
 To score 25+ points in 11+ consecutive games (streak was 23 games) : 36 years 354 days to 37 years 48 days.
 To score 40+ points and 11+ rebounds in a game (had 43 points and 14 rebounds) : 37 years, 1 day.
 To score a 30-point triple-double: 36 years, 347 days. 
 To average over 30 points per game for a season: 37 years, 101 days; 30.3 points.
 To score 5 or more consecutive 30 point games: 7 games, 37 years 346 days to 37 years 360 days.
 To score 35+ points, 10+ rebounds and 7+ 3-pointers: 37 years 331 days; 39 points, 11 rebounds, 7 3-pointers. (he was also the youngest)
 To have back to back 40+ point, 10+ rebound games: 38 years 0 days & 38 years 3 days.
 To score a 20-point triple-double: 28 pts, 10 rebounds, 11 assists, 38 years 32 days.

Cleveland Cavaliers franchise records

Regular season

Season
Season records cited from the Cavaliers' official website unless noted otherwise.
Minutes played: 3,388 (2004–05)
Field goals: 875 (2005–06)
Field goal attempts: 1,823 (2005–06)
Free throws: 601 (2005–06)
Free throw attempts: 814 (2005–06)
Points: 2,478 (2005–06)
Points per game: 31.4 (2005–06)
50 point games: 3 (2008–09)
40 point games: 10 (2005–06)

Game
Individual game records cited from the Cavaliers' official website unless noted otherwise.
Field goal attempts: 36, at Toronto Raptors, 
Three-point field goals: 8, at Milwaukee Bucks, (JR Smith tied) 
Shares record with Danny Ferry and Wesley Person
Three-point field goals, quarter: 5, four times
Shares record with Mark Price, Steve Kerr, and Wesley Person
Three-point field goal attempts: 13, three times
Shares record with Dan Majerle
Free throws: 24, at Miami Heat, 
Free throws made, half: 16, second half, at Miami Heat, 
Turnovers, half: 9, second half, at New Orleans Hornets, 
Points, quarter: 24, two times

Playoffs

Career
Games played: 152
Minutes played: 6,421
Points: 4,573
Free Throws Made: 1,070
Free Throws Attempts: 1,466
Field Goals Made: 1,628
Field Goals Attempts: 3,459
3 Point Field Goals Made: 247
3 Point Field Goal Attempts: 764
Total Rebounds: 1,388
Offensive Rebounds: 227
Defensive Rebounds: 1,161
Assists: 1,188
Steals: 264
Blocks: 162
Triple Doubles: 15

Scoring
Points per game average, career: 28.9
Points, game: 51, at Golden State Warriors, May 31, 2018 
Points, half: 28, first half, at Boston Celtics, May 7, 2010
Points, quarter: 23, first quarter, at Boston Celtics, May 7, 2010
Points, overtime: 10, at Orlando Magic, 
Consecutive points, game: 25, from 2:16 of fourth quarter to end of game (second overtime), at Detroit Pistons, 
LeBron scored his team's last seven points in the fourth quarter, all nine of his team's points in the first overtime, and all nine of his team's points in the second overtime.
 Games scoring 40 or more points, career: 14

Field goals
Field goals made, game: 20, vs. Orlando Magic, May 20, 2009
Field goals made, half: 11 (2 games)
Field goals made, quarter: 8, first quarter, at Boston Celtics, 
Field goals made, overtime: 4, second overtime, at Detroit Pistons, 
Field goal attempts, game: 33, at Detroit Pistons,  (2 OT)
Field goal attempts, half: 17, first half, at Detroit Pistons,

Three-point field goals
Three-point field goals made, game: 7, at Washington Wizards, 
Three-point field goals made, half: 5, first half, at Washington Wizards, April 30, 2006
Tied by Daniel Gibson (second half, vs. Detroit Pistons)
Three-point field goals made, overtime: 1, second overtime, at Detroit Pistons, 
Tied with Mark Price (at Chicago Bulls)
Three-point field goal attempts, half: 9, second half, at Boston Celtics,

Free throws
Free throws made, game: 18, at Orlando Magic, 
Free throws made, quarter: 10, fourth quarter, vs. Detroit Pistons, 
Free throws made, overtime: 5, first overtime, at Detroit Pistons, 
Free throw attempts, game: 24, at Orlando Magic, 
Free throw attempts, half: 16, second half, at Orlando Magic, 
Free throw attempts, quarter: 12 (2 games)
Free throw attempts, overtime: 6, first overtime, at Detroit Pistons,

Rebounding
Rebounds, half: 13, second half, at Boston Celtics, 
Defensive rebounds, game: 16, at Boston Celtics, 
Tied with Brad Daugherty (vs. New Jersey Nets)
Defensive rebounds, half: 12, second half, at Boston Celtics,

Turnovers
Turnovers, game: 10, (2 games)

Miami Heat franchise records

Regular season

Career 
Career records cited from Basketball Reference's Miami Heat Career Leaders page unless noted otherwise.
 Minutes Per Game: 38.0
 Points Per Game: 26.9
 Triple-doubles: 13 (five in playoffs)

Scoring
Points, quarter: 25 twice,
 first quarter at Cleveland Cavaliers, 
 third quarter vs Charlotte Bobcats,

Field goals
Field goals made, game: 22, vs. Charlotte Bobcats, March 3, 2014
Field goals made, first half: 12, at Orlando Magic, 
Field goals made, quarter: 10, third quarter, at Cleveland Cavaliers,

Turnovers
Turnovers, quarter: 5, first quarter, at Philadelphia 76ers, 
Tied with Jamal Mashburn (first quarter, vs. Sacramento Kings) and Lamar Odom (second quarter, vs. Washington Wizards)

Triple-doubles
Triple-doubles, career: 13 (five in playoffs)
Triple-doubles, season: 4, twice
 2010–11
 2012–13

Playoffs

Minutes  
Minutes played, game, 50:17 at Boston Celtics, May 9, 2011

Los Angeles Lakers franchise records

Regular season

Career 
Box score plus/minus: 8.1
Offensive box score plus/minus: 6.5

Other

Footnotes

References

James, LeBron
Cleveland Cavaliers
LeBron James